Robert John Barber (born 14 January 1945) is a former New Zealand rugby union player. A utility forward, Barber represented North Otago, Canterbury and Southland at a provincial level, and was a member of the New Zealand national side, the All Blacks, on their 1974 tour of Australia and Fiji. He played six matches on that tour but did not appear in any full test matches, although he did turn out in the game against Fiji. 

His daughter, Verity McLean, was killed in Invercargill in April 2017. Her husband, a serving police officer, was charged with her murder.

References

External links
 

1945 births
Living people
Rugby union players from Oamaru
People educated at Waitaki Boys' High School
New Zealand rugby union players
New Zealand international rugby union players
North Otago rugby union players
Canterbury rugby union players
Southland rugby union players
Rugby union locks
Rugby union flankers
Rugby union number eights